The following is a list of Charlotte 49ers men's basketball head coaches. The 49ers have had 11 coaches in their 52-season history. The team is currently coached by Ron Sanchez.

 An asterisk (*) denotes a season currently in progress.

References

Charlotte

Charlotte 49ers basketball coaches